Moment of Forever is the 56th studio album by American country music artist Willie Nelson., released on January 29, 2008 on the Lost Highway Records label. A video has been made for the album's first single "Gravedigger", and another video has been made for the track "You Don't Think I'm Funny Anymore", featuring Jessica Simpson, Owen Wilson, Woody Harrelson, Luke Wilson, and Dan Rather. The latter video premiered on the weekend of February 23–24 on MTV.

The title track, " Moment of Forever",  is a cover of a song written by Kris Kristofferson and Danny Timms. "The Bob Song" was originally recorded by Big & Rich for their CD/DVD set, Big & Rich's Super Galactic Fan Pak. "Louisiana" is a cover of a Randy Newman song. "Gravedigger" is a cover of the Dave Matthews song. "Keep Me From Blowing Away" is a cover of the Paul Craft song. "I'm Alive" was also recorded by Kenny Chesney on his album Lucky Old Sun. "Gotta Serve Somebody" is a Bob Dylan cover. This was Willie Nelson's final studio album to be released under the Lost Highway Records label as he would go on to sign a new contract with Sony Music.

Track listing
"Over You Again" (Willie Nelson, Micah Nelson, Lukas Nelson) - 5:35
"Moment of Forever" (Kris Kristofferson, Danny Timms) - 3:50
"The Bob Song" (Big Kenny Alphin) - 4:15
"Louisiana" (Randy Newman) - 3:25
"Gravedigger" (Dave Matthews) - 3:52
"Keep Me From Blowing Away" (Paul Craft) - 3:33
"Takin' on Water" (Dave Loggins, John Scott Sherrill, Dennis Robbins) - 3:24
"Always Now" (W. Nelson) - 3:28
"I'm Alive" (Kenny Chesney, Dean Dillon, Mark Tamburino) - 3:27
"When I Was Young and Grandma Wasn't Old" (Buddy Cannon) - 3:05
"Worry B Gone" (Guy Clark, Gary Nicholson, Lee Roy Parnell) - 3:10
Duet with Kenny Chesney
"You Don't Think I'm Funny Anymore" (W. Nelson) - 2:21
"Gotta Serve Somebody" (Bob Dylan) - 9:46

Double LP vinyl
On January 29, 2008, Lost Highway released Moment of Forever on double LP vinyl pressed at Nashville's historic United Record Pressing.

Side A
"Over You Again" (Willie Nelson, Micah Nelson, Lukas Nelson) - 5:35
"Moment of Forever" (Kris Kristofferson, Danny Timms) - 3:50
"The Bob Song" (Big Kenny) - 4:15
"Louisiana" (Randy Newman) - 3:25
"Gravedigger" (Dave Matthews) - 3:52

Side B
"Keep Me from Blowing Away" (Paul Craft) - 3:33
"Takin' on Water" (Dave Loggins, John Scott Sherrill, Dennis Robbins) - 3:24
"Always Now" (W. Nelson) - 3:28
"I'm Alive" (Kenny Chesney, Dean Dillon, Mark Tamburino) - 3:27
"When I Was Young and Grandma Wasn't Old" (Buddy Cannon) - 3:05

Side C
"Worry B Gone" (With Kenny Chesney) (Guy Clark, Gary Nicholson, Lee Roy Parnell) - 3:10
"You Don't Think I'm Funny Anymore" (W. Nelson) - 2:21
"Gotta Serve Somebody" (Bob Dylan) - 9:46

Personnel

 Wyatt Beard - background vocals
 Buddy Cannon - background vocals
 Melonie Cannon - background vocals
 Jim Chapman - background vocals
 Kenny Chesney - duet vocals on "Worry B Gone"
 Eric Darken - percussion
 Chris Dunn - trombone
 Kenny Greenberg - acoustic guitar, electric guitar
 Steve Herman - trumpet
 John Hobbs - keyboards, piano
 Jim Horn - horn arrangements, baritone saxophone, tenor saxophone
 Paul Leim - drums, percussion
 Sam Levine - tenor saxophone
 Randy McCormick - keyboards, Hammond organ, piano
 Willie Nelson - acoustic guitar, synthesizer, lead vocals
 Larry Paxton - bass guitar, upright bass, cello, fretless bass guitar, sousaphone
 Gary Prim - Hammond organ, piano
 Mickey Raphael - harmonica
 Tim Stafford - acoustic guitar
 Mark Tamburino - background vocals
 Quentin Ware - trumpet
 John Willis - acoustic guitar, gut string guitar

Chart performance

External links
Willie Nelson's Official Website
Record Label

2008 albums
Willie Nelson albums
Albums produced by Buddy Cannon
Lost Highway Records albums